Jewel often refers to:
Gemstone
Jewellery

Jewel may also refer to:

Companies
 Jewel-Osco, a U.S. grocery store chain
 Jewel Food Stores (Australia), an Australian grocery store chain
 Jewel Records (disambiguation), several record labels

People 
 Jewel (singer) (born Jewel Kilcher), American singer and actress
 Jewel Burks Solomon, American tech entrepreneur and venture capitalist
 Jewel De'Nyle (born 1976), American pornographic movie star, sometimes credited as "Jewel"
 Jewel Staite (born 1982), Canadian actress in Firefly

Fictional characters 
 Jewel, a Dalmatian puppy with spots forming a necklace in 101 Dalmatians
 Jewel, one of the main characters in the animated film Rio and its sequel Rio 2
 Jessica Jones, a superheroine in the Marvel Universe who uses the alias Jewel
 Jewel the Beetle, a character from the IDW Publishing comic series Sonic the Hedgehog

Music
 Jewel (Beni album), 2010
 Jewel (Marcella Detroit album), 1994
 "Jewel", a song by Ayumi Hamasaki on her 2006 album Secret
 "Jewel", a song by Blonde Redhead on their 1995 album La Mia Vita Violenta
 "Jewel", a song by Bradley Joseph on his 1997 album Rapture
 "Jewel", a song by T. Rex on their 1970 self-titled album

Television and movies 
 Jewel (1915 film), an American silent drama film
 Jewel (2001 film), a television film

Other uses
 Jewel, novel by Bret Lott
 Jewel Changi Airport, an airport terminal complex in Singapore
 Jewel Tower, a tower of the Palace of Westminster, in London, England
 Fraternal jewels, the medals worn in both secular and religious fraternal organisations
 Jewel beetles, the family Buprestidae
 Jewel butterflies, various Lycaenidae
 Jewel damselflies, the family Chlorocyphidae
 Jewel bearing, a jewel-lined bearing commonly used in mechanical watches
 KJUL, a radio station licensed to Moapa Valley, Nevada, which calls itself 104.7 the Jewel

See also
 Joule (disambiguation)
Jewell (disambiguation)
Jewells (disambiguation)
Jewels (disambiguation)
 Juul (disambiguation)